KZDB (100.5 FM) is a radio station licensed to Roswell, New Mexico, United States. The station is currently owned Majestic Broadcasting, LLC.

On August 1, 2017, KZDB changed their format from classic rock (which moved to KSFX 1230 AM) to classic hits, branded as "100.5 Kool FM".

References

External links

ZDB
Radio stations established in 1992
1992 establishments in New Mexico
Classic hits radio stations in the United States